Langwarrin is a suburb in Melbourne, Victoria, Australia,  south-east of Melbourne's Central Business District, located within the City of Frankston local government area.

Langwarrin is bounded in the north generally by Valley Road, in the east by Dandenong-Hastings Road, in the south by Robinsons Road and in the west by the Mornington Peninsula Freeway and by McClelland Drive to the north of the suburb.

It is a very liveable area with an abundance of family friendly areas.

History

Langwarrin has three  post offices opening after the arrival of the Stony Point railway in 1889, Langwarrin Railway Station on 9 September 1889 and Langwarrin away from the railway on 26 September 1889. Langwarrin was shut down in 1893 and Langwarrin Railway Station was renamed Langwarrin in 1913.

Geography

It has access to the City via the Western Port Highway, South Gippsland Highway and Monash Freeway. The Cranbourne-Frankston Road which runs east-to-west through Langwarrin is a two-lane-each-direction carriageway, recently widened to cater for this growing population, in part helped by a number of housing developments.

Until December 1994 Langwarrin was part of the City of Cranbourne (formerly the Shire of Cranbourne until April 1994). At this time the suburb was moved into City of Frankston as part of statewide reform of local government.

Langwarrin Flora and Fauna reserve (formerly Langwarrin Military Reserve)
Langwarrin's most prominent landscape feature is its large Flora and Fauna reserve (formerly the Langwarrin Military Reserve). The nature reserve has many walking tracks and is an ideal place for quiet recreation activities such as walking, cartwheeling, nature study and photography.

The Langwarrin Military Reserve was established in 1886 at what was then deemed to be a strategic elevated location for the defence of Port Phillip Bay and Melbourne from seaborne attack.

Prior to World War I, the reserve was used mainly for temporary encampments of volunteer soldiery from throughout Victoria held at Easter or after New Year. These were held here in
1888, 1891, 1894, 1896, 1900, 1901, 1902, 1904 and 1910 as evidenced by the dates the Langwarrin Camp Post Office was open. The Langwarrin railway station was opened in 1888 next to the facility; in the same year a failed attempt was made to sell allotments on a new township of Aldershot adjoining the reserve. On the outbreak of World War 1 the reserve was used for the detention of enemy aliens (predominantly Germans) and from 1915 a military hospital for combatants with venereal disease was established.

After World War II, the reserve was used occasionally for military training, until 1974 when it came under control of the Balcombe Military Camp and was used for training of Army Reserve and school cadet units etc.. In 1980 the reserve was leased to the Victorian Ministry of Conservation and in 1982 the State Government purchased the reserve from the Commonwealth Government.

Today, all the buildings are gone. Remaining evidence of past use include earthworks, drainage and foundations and changes in the pattern of vegetation following regrowth after clearing.

Recreation

Langwarrin is home to the following parks and attractions:
Langwarrin Skatepark
Langwarrin Men's Shed
Lloyd Park - a sport park with netball courts, tennis courts and three football ovals. It is also home to a Scout Centre. 
Berretta's Langwarrin Hotel, a popular bistro with an expansive multi-level indoor playground.
Langwarrin Girl guides unit - based on Warrandyte road near the Flora & Fauna reserve.
 Cruden Farm, the home of the late Dame Elisabeth Murdoch with its gardens is sometimes open to the public and various events are held there throughout the year.
 Langwarrin beach. A small beach by comparison to most, known for its warm waters especially in the summer months. With its small, uniquely shaped left-handed beach break, and life saving club it’s become a very popular year-round beach.

McClelland Gallery

The McClelland Gallery and Sculpture Park is a prominent gallery, set in eight hectares of landscaped bushland, featuring a sculpture park. It was named in honour of renowned Frankston artists, Nan McClelland and Harry McClelland. The McClelland Award is Australia's richest sculpture prize, and is awarded by the gallery biennially (supported by the gallery's patron and Langwarrin resident, the late Dame Elisabeth Murdoch).

Sport

An Australian rules football club, the Langwarrin Kangaroos, compete in the Mornington Peninsula Nepean Football League as well as being one of Victoria's largest junior football clubs. Langwarrin is also well represented by basketball, tennis, netball, cricket and dancing clubs.

Lloyd Park is a large local sporting venue, that has facilities for netball, tennis and football.

Langwarrin Pony Club and the Peninsula Adult Riders Club provide cross-country, dressage and show jumping facilities for equestrian enthusiasts at the Langwarrin Equestrian & Recreation Reserve.

Shopping

Langwarrin has two main shopping centres: The Gateway Shopping Centre, 230 Cranbourne - Frankston Rd (owned by Vicinity Centres) - home to a Coles supermarket and 40 speciality stores and Langwarrin Plaza Shopping Centre, 385 Cranbourne – Frankston Rd, home to a Woolworths supermarket. Target Country closed down in The Gateway Shopping Centre in early-mid 2021.

There are also a number of small shopping strips, including Long Street, and at the corner of North Road and Warrandyte Road.

Fires

Langwarrin has had many fires, the most recent on 21 January 2009 where a fire broke out just near Pindara Boulevard. The fire burnt . There was also a large fire in the Langwarrin Flora and Fauna Reserve in December 1999.

Schools

Woodlands Primary School
 Elisabeth Murdoch College (formerly Langwarrin Post Primary School (1984-1986), Langwarrin Secondary College (1987-2004))
Langwarrin Park Primary School
Langwarrin Primary School
St. Jude's Primary School

Notable residents

 Dame Elisabeth Murdoch, Australian socialite and philanthropist
 Nevil Shute, English-born novelist
 Sir Daryl Lindsay, Australian artist (resided at the now heritage-listed Mulberry Hill)
 Lady Joan Lindsay, Australian author (also resided Mulberry Hill)
 Michael Paynter, Australian musician
 Luke Parker (Australian footballer), Australian Rules footballer
 Jarred Moore, Australian Rules footballer and coach
 Bailey Wright, Australian football player

See also
 City of Cranbourne – Langwarrin was previously within this former local government area.
 City of Frankston – Langwarrin is located within this local government area.
 List of Frankston people - notable people from the City of Frankston (including Langwarrin).
 Langwarrin railway station

References

Suburbs of Melbourne
Suburbs and localities in the City of Frankston